Short-track speed skating at the 1996 Asian Winter Games took place in the city of Harbin, China, with ten events being contested – five each for men and women.

Medalists

Men

Women

Medal table

References
 

 
1996 Asian Winter Games events
1996
International speed skating competitions hosted by China
1996 in short track speed skating